Daniel James Platzman (born September 28, 1986) is an American musician, songwriter, record producer and composer. He is the drummer for the pop rock band Imagine Dragons.

Early life
Platzman was born on September 28, 1986 in Atlanta, Georgia. He attended Berklee College of Music where he earned a degree in film scoring.  While at Berklee, Platzman played in the Berklee Concert Jazz Orchestra, the Urban Outreach Jazz Orchestra and the Berklee Rainbow Big Band, and received the Vic Firth Award for Outstanding Musicianship and the Michael Rendish Award in Film Scoring.  He also played in a guitar performance ensemble with future Imagine Dragons bandmates Wayne Sermon and Ben McKee.

Career

Imagine Dragons
In 2011, Platzman was invited by Wayne Sermon to join Imagine Dragons, based out of Las Vegas. McKee dropped out of his final semester at Berklee to join the band, inviting Daniel Platzman to play drums, completing the lineup. The band proceeded to earn a number of local accolades including "Best CD of 2011" (Vegas SEVEN), "Best Local Indie Band 2010" (Las Vegas Weekly), "Las Vegas' Newest Must See Live Act" (Las Vegas CityLife),  and more sent the band on a positive trajectory. In November 2011 they signed with Interscope Records and began working with producer Alex da Kid.

In 2012, their debut album Night Visions brought the band mainstream success. It reached #2 on the Billboard 200 chart and won the Billboard Music Award for Best Rock Album (2014). Single "It's Time" became the band's first single reaching #15 Billboard Hot 100 and certified multi-platinum by the RIAA. Second single "Radioactive" reached #3 Billboard Hot 100 and was certified diamond by the RIAA, becoming the best selling rock song in the history of Nielsen SoundScan. Third single "Demons" reached #6 Billboard Hot 100 and was certified multi-platinum by the RIAA. Their album made the highest debut for a new rock band in six years (since 2006) and single Radioactive set a new record for longest time atop the Billboard Hot Rock Songs chart with 23 consecutive weeks.  Tracks from the album topped the Billboard Rock Songs, Billboard Alternative Songs, and Billboard Pop Songs charts. Radioactive was also nominated for two Grammy Awards, winning the Grammy Award for Best Rock Performance.

In 2015, Imagine Dragons' second album Smoke + Mirrors reached #1 on the Billboard 200, UK Albums Chart, and Canadian Albums Chart.  It features singles "I Bet My Life", "Shots" and "Gold".

The band has contributed songs to several film soundtracks, including "Ready Aim Fire" for Iron Man 3, "Who We Are" for The Hunger Games: Catching Fire, "Battle Cry" for Transformers: Age of Extinction and "Not Today" for Me Before You. In addition, in September 2014, "Warriors" was released by Riot Games along with an animated music video promoting the League of Legends World Championships.

Platzman appeared on the cover of Drum! magazine's March 2015 issue. Two months later he was profiled again in Drum!.

On March 3, 2023, Platzman released his first single as a solo artist, titled “Show Me That You Want Me,” accompanied with a music video.

Film and television scoring

Platzman, who studied film scoring at Berklee College of Music, composed the original score for the 2014 season of Africa Investigates, the award-winning investigative documentary series on Al Jazeera English produced by Insight TWI. Africa Investigates is the first internationally broadcast documentary series fronted exclusively by African investigative journalists.  Platzman also contributed music to the film Best F(r)iends and scored the short film "Eagles are Turning People Into Horses: The Movie" by Nick Kocher and Brian McElhaney.

Discography

Awards

Vic Firth Award for Outstanding Musicianship, Berklee College of Music
Michael Rendish Award in Film Scoring, Berklee College of Music

References

External links

 

Living people
American alternative rock musicians
American indie rock musicians
American male singers
American drummers
Imagine Dragons members
Musicians from Atlanta
Musicians from Las Vegas
Berklee College of Music alumni
1986 births
Jewish rock musicians
American people of Jewish descent
21st-century American singers
21st-century American drummers
Alumni of The Paideia School